Amatrice is a town and comune in the province of Rieti, in northern Lazio (central Italy), and the center of the food-agricultural area of Gran Sasso e Monti della Laga National Park. The town was devastated by a powerful earthquake on 24 August 2016.

History
Archaeological discoveries show a human presence in the area of Amatrice since prehistoric times, and the remains of Roman buildings and tombs have also been found. After the fall of the Western Roman Empire, the area became part of the Lombard Duchy of Spoleto, included in the comitatus of Ascoli. The town of Matrice is mentioned in the papers of the Abbey of Farfa in 1012 as commanding the confluence of the Tronto and Castellano rivers. In the year 900 the Pope was from Amatrice.

The medieval and early modern periods

In 1265, during the reign of Manfred of Sicily, Amatrice became part of the Kingdom of Naples. After the capture of Naples by the Angevins, Amatrice rebelled but was vanquished by Charles I of Anjou in 1274, although it maintained some sort of autonomy as an universitas.

In the 14th and 15th century, Amatrice was frequently in conflict with the neighbouring cities of Norcia, Arquata and L'Aquila, and its troops took part in the siege of l’Aquila under Braccio da Montone. In the course of the conflict between Angevins and the Aragonese for the possession of the Kingdom of Naples, Amatrice sided with Naples.

The Church of Sant'Agostino (pictured left) was built in 1428.

In 1529, Amatrice was stormed by troops of Philibert of Chalon, a general in the service of Emperor Charles V, who gave it to its general Alessandro Vitelli.

The city was severely damaged by an earthquake in 1639.

Later, Amatrice was held by the Orsini and the Medici of Florence, who kept it until 1737.

The modern period
After the unification of Italy in the 19th century, Amatrice became part of the province of L'Aquila in the region of Abruzzo, eventually being annexed to Lazio in 1927.

On 24 August 2016, a powerful earthquake struck Amatrice, devastating the town and killing at least 295 people. Sergio Pirozzi, at the time the mayor of Amatrice (in March 2018 he was elected in the Regional Council of Lazio), said that the town "is no more". Later, Pirozzi said that "three-quarters of the town was destroyed". Nearby Accumoli and Pescara del Tronto were also devastated.

Historical buildings

‡ Withstood the 2016 earthquake 
† Did not withstand the earthquake

Cuisine
Amatrice is especially famous for a pasta sauce, sugo all'amatriciana, usually served with a long pasta such as bucatini, spaghetti, or vermicelli. According to popular tradition, numerous cooks of the Popes down the centuries came from Amatrice.

People

Nicola Filotesio (1480 or 1489–1547 or 1559), Italian painter, architect and sculptor of the Renaissance period.
Giovanni Domenico Roberto Minozzi (1884-1959), Italian Roman Catholic priest who founded Opera nazionale per il Mezzogiorno d'Italia.
Elio Augusto Di Carlo (1918–1998), Italian ornithologist, historian and physician.
Sara Pichelli (born 1983), artist.

Frazioni
Frazioni of the town include Aleggia, Bagnolo, Capricchia, Casale, Casale Bucci, Casale Celli, Casale Masacci, Casale Nadalucci, Casalene, Casale Nibbi, Casale Sanguigni, Casale Sautelli, Casale Zocchi, Casali della Meta, Cascello, Castel Trione, Collalto, Collecreta, Collegentilesco, Collemagrone, Collemoresco, Collepagliuca, Colletroio, Colli, Conche, Configno, Cornelle, Cornillo Nuovo, Cornillo Vecchio, Cossara, Cossito, Crognale, Domo, Faizzone, Ferrazza, Filetto, Fiumatello, Francucciano, Le Forme, Moletano, Musicchio, Nommisci, Osteria della Meta, Pasciano, Patàrico, Petrana, Pinaco Arafranca, Poggio Vitellino, Prato, Preta, Rio, Retrosi, Roccapassa, Rocchetta, Saletta, San Benedetto, San Capone, San Giorgio, San Lorenzo a Pinaco, San Sebastiano, Santa Giusta, Sant'Angelo, San Tommaso, Scai, Sommati, Torrita, Torritella, Varoni, Villa San Cipriano, Villa San Lorenzo e Flaviano, and Voceto.

References

Cities and towns in Lazio
Municipalities of the Province of Rieti
Cities destroyed by earthquakes